IBC Tower is a skyscraper in the IBC building complex in Bockenheim district of Frankfurt, Germany.

The IBC was built by Deutsche Bank on a design by architect Kohler and was completed in 2003. It is situated at Theodor-Heuss-Allee close to the Frankfurt Trade Fair grounds.

Originally, Deutsche Bank planned as Investment Banking Center to concentrate their traders in the complex. This has never been implemented. Finally, Deutsche Bank sold the entire complex to the U.S. financial investor Blackstone Group and only rented Building B, in which the German Private and Business Bank AG and parts of the Deutsche Bank Human Resources division moved in. Building A was rented by the Degussa Bank GmbH, ING Real Estate Development and Construction and the INDUSTRIA rental company rented mbH.

In 2006, Deutsche Bank also temporarily rented Building C, the IBC Tower, because of a major renovation in their company headquarters, the Deutsche Bank Twin Towers. The renovation was completed in 2011.

See also 
 List of tallest buildings in Frankfurt
 List of tallest buildings in Germany

References

External links 

 IBC Tower homepage

Office buildings completed in 2003
Skyscrapers in Frankfurt
Skyscraper office buildings in Germany